The women's 10 kilometre classical competition in cross-country skiing at the 2022 Winter Olympics was held on 10 February, at the Kuyangshu Nordic Center and Biathlon Center in Zhangjiakou. Therese Johaug of Norway became the Olympic champion, Kerttu Niskanen of Finland won the silver medal, and Krista Pärmäkoski, also of Finland, won bronze.

Summary
The 10 km distance event alternates between the Olympics, and in 2018 it was the freestyle event. The 2018 champion, Ragnhild Haga, qualified for the Olympics, but was not selected for the event. The silver medalist, Charlotte Kalla, qualified. The bronze medal in 2018 was split between Marit Bjørgen and Krista Pärmäkoski. Bjørgen since retired from international competitions, while Pärmäkoski qualified for the 2022 Olympics. The overall leader of the 2021–22 FIS Cross-Country World Cup before the Olympics was Natalya Nepryayeva, and the distance leader was Frida Karlsson. Therese Johaug is the 2021 World Champion in 10 km freestyle.

The only skier able to offer any competition to Johaug was Kerttu Niskanen, who started 2 minutes behind Johaug and sometimes was leading, but at the finish lost by 0.4 seconds to Johaug and came in second. Pärmäkoski was third, 0.1 seconds ahead of late starter Nepryayeva.

Qualification

Results
The race was started at 15:00.

References

Women's cross-country skiing at the 2022 Winter Olympics